"This Is America" is a song by American rapper Donald Glover, under his musical stage name Childish Gambino. Written and produced by Glover and Ludwig Göransson, with additional writing credits going to American rapper Young Thug, it was released on May 6, 2018 at the same time that Gambino was hosting an episode of Saturday Night Live. The song features background vocals from Young Thug alongside fellow American rappers Slim Jxmmi of Rae Sremmurd, BlocBoy JB, Quavo of Migos, and Atlanta-based rapper 21 Savage. The lyrics and accompanying music video, reflecting the core of the Black Lives Matter movement, confront issues of ongoing systemic racism, including prejudice, racial violence, the ghetto, and law enforcement in the United States, as well as the wider issues of mass shootings and gun violence in the United States.

The song's accompanying music video was directed by filmmaker Hiro Murai, a frequent Gambino collaborator. "This Is America" became the 31st song to debut at number one on the US Billboard Hot 100, becoming both Gambino's first number one and top ten single in the country. It has also topped the charts in Australia, Canada, and New Zealand. The song won in all four of its nominated categories at the 61st Annual Grammy Awards: Record of the Year, Song of the Year, Best Rap/Sung Performance and Best Music Video. This made Gambino the first hip-hop artist to win Record of the Year and Song of the Year, and "This Is America" the first rap song to win these awards.

Composition
The song features a gospel-style choir and background contributions from various American rappers. Young Thug, Slim Jxmmi, BlocBoy JB, 21 Savage and Quavo each deliver an ad-lib. Young Thug returns to supply the song's outro. The lyrics primarily address black culture in the United States and gun violence in the country. It also touches on the subject of police brutality and misconduct. Pitchfork's Stephen Kearse described the song as a representation of the "tightrope of being black", with the song "built on the sharp contrast between jolly, syncretic melodies and menacing trap cadences". Bryan Rolli of Forbes calls it "a vicious, urgent take on modern trap music, as Glover adopts the clipped, percussive flow of his contemporaries atop crackling 808s and rumbling bass."

Media outlets reported that a number of listeners accused Gambino of plagiarism over "This Is America", pointing out the similarities between the song and "American Pharaoh" by Jase Harley. CBS News stated, "The tracks have a similar sound, and share similar themes in the lyrics." Harley stated that he felt "This Is America" was influenced by his song. At the time, he did not have an issue with this. However, when Gambino did not acknowledge him at the Grammys, Harley was upset and called Gambino a "house slave". Glover's manager, Fam Rothstein, denied any plagiarism.

Music video analysis

The music video was directed by Hiro Murai and released on YouTube simultaneously with Gambino's performance of the song on Saturday Night Live. The video received about 12.9 million views in 24 hours, and has over 850+ million views as of September 2022. In an interview with the New York Times, Murai discussed his upcoming season for Atlanta, a show created by and starring Glover. He stated, "There's sort of a world-weariness in both this season and the music video. They're both reactions to what's happening in the world."

The video contains many scenes involving violence. It starts off with a shirtless Gambino dancing through a warehouse, interacting with a series of chaotic scenes. According to Murai, the video was inspired by the films Mother! and City of God. Prettyman states "The video tests us, taunting us to keep pace as we try to decode every gesture and calculation". Choreographed by Sherrie Silver, Gambino and his entourage of young dancers perform several viral dance moves including the South African Gwara gwara and "Shoot" popularized by BlocBoy JB, who is one of the ad-lib contributors on the song. Gambino's dancing is contrasted against moments of violence. Only 53 seconds into the video, Gambino shoots a man in the back of the head with a handgun, while assuming a comical stance similar to a Jim Crow caricature. The first person depicted as being shot in the video, a guitarist who had been accompanying Gambino's singing up to that point, was musician Calvin the Second, but was initially mistaken by many viewers to be the father of 17-year-old gun violence victim Trayvon Martin. This first shooting also marks a transition in the music, from an African "folk-inspired melody" to "dark, pulsing trap".

At a later point, Childish Gambino uses a Kalashnikov patterned automatic weapon to gun down a church choir, which viewers have interpreted as a reference to the 2015 Charleston church shooting. This may also be his commentary on acculturation,  the toxic embrace of capitalism and consumerism, both at the expense of spirituality, where one's history and community are gunned down in pursuit of a toxic American dream.

In both scenes a child appears from off-screen holding a red cloth, on which Gambino gently lays the weapon used, while the bodies are simply dragged away, which viewers have interpreted "as a reference to Americans' willingness to protect gun rights over people". A group of children in school uniforms join Gambino in dancing, only to panic and scatter when the music imitates the sound of gunfire and Gambino positions his arms as if firing a gun, after which he lights a joint; this has been interpreted as a reference to school shootings, as well as a possible comparison of the demonization of marijuana users compared to the celebration of gun owners. Other schoolchildren are seen on a catwalk above, using their cell phones to record the chaos happening in the video as Gambino sings the lyrics "This a celly / That's a tool". Martha Tesema, writer for website Mashable, stated that "cell phones have been used as tools to broadcast police shooting, rioting against, or choking black people in this country". The line serves as a double entendre, also referring to the use of mass incarceration as a tool of the police state. Throughout the video, numerous vehicles from several decades ago are featured, many of them with their hazard lights flashing and the driver's side door ajar, which critics interpreted as representing fatal police shootings during traffic stops, particularly the shooting of Philando Castile, who was shot while in a 1997 Oldsmobile; others have interpreted that the older model cars represent the relative lack of upward mobility of African Americans. American singer SZA makes a cameo appearance towards the end of the video, seated atop one of these vehicles. The video ends with Gambino in a darkened portion of the warehouse, fearfully running towards the camera while being chased by several white people. Viewers have said this resembles scenes from the 2017 film Get Out.

The dance moves were choreographed by Rwandan-born Sherrie Silver based on various African dances such as the Ghanaian Azonto, Nigerian Shoki, and the South African Gwara gwara, as well as gyration or walking moves from Angola and Ivory Coast.

Critical reception
The music video received widespread critical acclaim. Spencer Kornhaber of The Atlantic described the initial reaction on Twitter as "a gushing river of well-deserved praise" and the video as "the most talked-about music video of recent memory." Daniel Kreps of Rolling Stone commented that the video "is a surreal, visceral statement about gun violence in America". Pitchfork awarded the song the distinction of "Best New Track". Billboard critics ranked it 10th among the "greatest music videos of the 21st century." Mahita Gajanan of Time quoted music history professor Guthrie Ramsey at the University of Pennsylvania:

Will Gompertz, arts editor of the BBC, asserted that "This Is America" was a "powerful and poignant allegorical portrait of 21st Century America, which warrants a place among the canonical depictions of the USA from Grant Wood's American Gothic to Edward Hopper's Nighthawks, from Emanuel Leutze's Washington Crossing the Delaware to America the Beautiful by Norman Lewis".

In December 2018, Billboard ranked "This Is America" as the 6th best song of the year.

The music video won the International Film Festival of the Art of Cinematography Camerimage Award for Best Cinematography in a Music Video, as well as the Grammy Award for Best Music Video at the 61st Grammy Awards.

Media appearances
Glover hosted the May 5 episode of the 43rd season of Saturday Night Live, and performed two new songs as Childish Gambino on the same episode, the second of which was "This Is America". Daniel Kaluuya, best known as the star of the film Get Out which the music video reportedly references, introduced the song's performance.

Cover versions, adaptations, and in popular culture 
Several artists attracted attention and millions of views for creating covers of the song and music video with altered lyrics and themes, retaining the song's instrumental and the general structure of its music video.

Bay Area rapper Lil B featured a remix of his own on his Options mixtape entitled "This Is the BasedGod" in October 2018.

The music video also spawned popular Internet memes, particularly those in which the audio was replaced so that Childish Gambino appeared to be dancing in time to another song. Versions using Carly Rae Jepsen's "Call Me Maybe", Earth, Wind & Fire's "September" and Banda Blanca's "Sopa de Caracol" were some of the most viewed.

The song is interpolated into a scene in the film Guava Island (released 2019), which features Glover and Rihanna.

Other countries
Covers and parodies of the song were generated around the world, including:
 "This Is Nigeria" was released by Nigerian rapper Falz released on May 25, 2018, highlighting the nation's issues with corruption and organized crime in Nigeria, among other themes.
 "This Is Sierra Leone" (June 2018).
 "This Is Barbados" (June 2018)
 "This Is Malaysia" (June 2018).
 "This Is Iraq" (January 2019) parodies the US-led invasion of Iraq.
 "This Is Australia" (January 2023), by Australian dance company Marrugeku, with vocals led by Noongar rapper Beni Bjah, features many local references, and criticises Australia's treatment of refugees, Aboriginal and Torres Strait Islander people, and migrants.

Chart performance
"This Is America" debuted at number one on the US Billboard Hot 100, becoming the 31st song to do so in the chart's history. It debuted with 78,000 downloads sold and 65.3 million US streams in the first week. Its music video accounted for 68% of the song's streaming total. "This Is America" is also Gambino's first top 10; he previously reached number 12 in August 2017 with "Redbone". "This Is America" overtook Drake's "Nice for What" from the top position for two weeks. Gambino is also the second Emmy Award-winning actor to reach number one on the Hot 100, the first being Justin Timberlake, who topped the chart with "Can't Stop the Feeling!" in 2016. It topped the Hot 100 for two weeks, and left the top ten after five weeks.

Credits and personnel
Credits are adapted from Tidal.

 Donald Glover – lead vocals (as Childish Gambino), production, composition
 Jeffery Lamar Williams – composition, backing vocals (as Young Thug)
 Quavo – background vocals
 21 Savage – backing vocals
 Slim Jxmmi – backing vocals
 BlocBoy JB – backing vocals
 Ludwig Göransson – production, composition, recording engineer
 Alex Tumay – recording engineer
 Riley Mackin – recording engineer
 Kesha "K.Lee" Lee – recording engineer
 Dru Castro – recording engineer
 Dacota G. Fresilli – recording engineer
 Zak Menebhi – recording engineer
 Derek "MixedByAli" Ali – mixing engineer
 Mike Bozzi – mastering engineer

Charts

Weekly charts

Year-end charts

Certifications

Release history

See also
 List of number-one singles of 2018 (Australia)
 List of number-one urban singles of 2018 (Australia)
 List of number-one streaming tracks of 2018 (Australia)
 List of top 10 singles in 2018 (Australia)
 List of Canadian Hot 100 number-one singles of 2018
 List of number-one singles from the 2010s (New Zealand)
 List of Billboard Hot 100 number-one singles of 2018
 List of number-one R&B/hip-hop songs of 2018 (U.S.)
 Billboard Year-End Hot 100 singles of 2018

References

External links
 Audio at YouTube

2018 songs
2018 singles
Donald Glover songs
Billboard Hot 100 number-one singles
Canadian Hot 100 number-one singles
Number-one singles in Australia
Number-one singles in New Zealand
RCA Records singles
Songs involved in plagiarism controversies
Songs written by Donald Glover
Songs written by Ludwig Göransson
Songs about the United States
Songs against racism and xenophobia
Trap music songs
Internet memes
Internet memes introduced in 2018
Grammy Award for Record of the Year
Grammy Award for Song of the Year
Grammy Award for Best Short Form Music Video
Grammy Award for Best Rap/Sung Collaboration
MTV Video Music Award for Best Direction
MTV Video Music Award for Best Video with a Social Message
Political rap songs
Songs written by Young Thug
2010s fads and trends
Songs about violence
Works about gun politics in the United States